The discography of Finnish DJ and music producer Darude consists of four studio albums, fourteen singles, and a multitude of remixes and other productions. His debut single, "Sandstorm", was an international breakthrough hit, peaking within the top ten in several countries. It has also gained recognition for its significant amount of usage in sporting events and popularity within internet meme culture. His second single, "Feel the Beat", was also a commercial success, peaking in the top twenty in multiple countries. Darude's debut studio album, Before the Storm, was released on 5 September 2000 and was a commercial success, as well. Darude released three studio albums following Before the Storm: Rush (2003), Label This! (2007), and Moments (2015).

Albums

Studio albums

Singles

Official remixes and other productions
The following is an incomplete list of official remixes released by Darude, with year of remix release, original artist(s), and remix name.

References

External links
 Darude.com

Discographies of Finnish artists
Electronic music discographies